Harald Waldemar Bødtker (May 10, 1855 – March 12, 1925) was a Norwegian architect.

Biography
Bødtker was born at Overhalla in Nord-Trøndelag, Norway. He was raised in the valley of  Namdalen. He started his career as an assistant for architects Henrik Nissen and  Holm Munthe in  Kristiania (now Oslo). He attended the  Academy of Fine Arts Vienna  where he studied under Danish born architect Theophilus Hansen from  1880-83. He then worked as assistant to Theophilus Hansen in Vienna until around 1889.  Bødtker worked at German based architectural offices in Buenos Aires and Rio de Janeiro from 1890-1892. He then spent time as  construction  manager in Petrópolis which was the summer residence of the Brazilian Emperors and aristocrats in the 19th century.  

In 1896, he opened his own architectural practice at Kristiania. Bødtker was the municipal architect of Aker from 1899 to 1923 and was involved in designing a number of churches and especially schools in what is now Oslo. Among his extensive work were additions to Aker University Hospital  completed between 1917-1922. He died in Oslo.

Selected works 
 Grorud Church (1900–1902)
 Grefsen Chapel at Grefsen Church (1901–1904)
 Ullern Church (1904)
 University Hall at the University of Oslo (1909–1911, together with Holger Sinding-Larsen)
 Bekkelaget Church (1920–1923)
 Gjerpen Church (rebuilt 1921)

References

1855 births
1925 deaths
Architects from Oslo
People from Nord-Trøndelag
Academy of Fine Arts Vienna alumni